Cestria may refer to:

 The town of Chester le Street in County Durham, England
 Cestria (Epirus), a town of ancient Epirus
 Cestria (Power Rangers), a character in the Power Rangers
 Historical Latin name for Chester, England and the county of Cheshire. (also as Cestriæ)